Zhu Shaoyu (朱绍玉; born 1946 in Beijing) in a Chinese composer. His opera You and Me was staged at the China's National Centre for the Performing Arts (NCPA) in 2013.

References

1946 births
Living people